Set It Off may refer to:

Albums
 Set It Off, a 1994 album by Madball
 Set It Off, a 2000 album by Shuvel
 Set It Off (Thousand Foot Krutch album), 2001
 Set It Off, a 2002 album by Shy FX and T Power

Songs
 "Set It Off" (Juvenile song), 2001
 "Set It Off" (Peaches song), 2001
 "Set It Off" (Young Gunz song), 2005
 "Set It Off" (J. Williams song), 2008
 "Set It Off" (Kardinal Offishall song), 2008
 "Set It Off" (Timomatic song), 2011
 "Set It Off", a 1984 song by Strafe
 "Set It Off", a 1985 song by Masquerade
 "Set It Off", a 1988 song from the album Long Live the Kane by Big Daddy Kane
 "Set It Off", a 1989 song released as a single by Nice & Smooth
 “Set It Off”, a 1994 song from the album ‘’Set It Off’’ by Madball
 "Set It Off", a 1994 song from the album Fuck What You Think by Main Source
 "Set It Off", a 2000 song from the album Tha Last Meal by Snoop Dogg
 "Set It Off", a 2000 song from the album Set It Off by Shuvel
 "Set It Off", a 2001 song from the album Satellite by P.O.D.
 "Set It Off", a 2002 song from the album Audioslave by Audioslave
 "Set It Off", a 2007 song from the album Noreality by N.O.R.E
 "Set It Off", a 2008 song from the mixtape Sucka Free by Nicki Minaj

Other uses
 Set It Off (band), a pop punk band from Tampa, Florida
 Set It Off (film), a 1996 action film starring Queen Latifah and Jada Pinkett Smith